Mersch is a commune and town in central Luxembourg, capital of the canton of Mersch. It is situated at the confluence of the rivers Alzette, Mamer and Eisch.

, the town of Mersch, which lies in the centre of the commune, has a population of 3,345.  Other towns within the commune include Beringen, Berschbach, Moesdorf, Pettingen, Reckange, Rollingen, and Schoenfels.

Mersch is the home of the National Literature Centre, Luxembourg's national literary archive.  The town is the site of one of the six regional headquarters of the Grand Ducal Police.

Mersch Castle is one of the castles belonging to the Valley of the Seven Castles. Located in the centre of the town, its history goes back to the 13th century. Today the castle houses the administrative offices of the local commune.

Transportation
Mersch is connected to the centre and north of the country on Line 10 trains serving Mersch railway station.

Population

References

External links

 

 
Communes in Mersch (canton)
Towns in Luxembourg